As Ugly as It Gets: The Very Best of Ugly Kid Joe is a 1998 compilation album by Ugly Kid Joe. It included select songs from the band's first two releases as well as a cover of the Black Sabbath song "N.I.B." (previously included on the tribute album Nativity in Black). Although this compilation album was released after Motel California, it contains none of the singles from that album as Ugly Kid Joe had switched record labels by that time.

Track listing
 "Madman" – 3:37
 "Neighbor" – 4:43
 "Cat's in the Cradle" – 4:01
 "Everything About You" – 4:20
 "Tomorrow's World" – 4:18
 "God" – 2:54
 "Busy Bee" – 4:08
 "C.U.S.T." – 2:59
 "Milkman's Son" – 3:51
 "N.I.B." – 5:24
 "Goddamn Devil" – 4:53
 "Slower Than Nowhere" – 4:58
 "Funky Fresh Country Club" – 5:16
 "Panhandlin' Prince" - 5:43
 "Jesus Rode A Harley" - 3:15

References

1998 compilation albums
Ugly Kid Joe albums
Mercury Records compilation albums